The field hockey tournament at the 1979 Pan American Games was the fourth edition of the field hockey event at the Pan American Games. It took place in San Juan, Puerto Rico from 6 to 14 July 1979.

The three-time defending champions Argentina won their fourth gold medal in a row by defeating Canada 3–0 in the final. Mexico took the bronze medal by defeating Cuba 5–3 after extra time.

Results

Group stage

Group A

Group B

Ninth to tenth place classification

Fifth to eighth place classification

5–8th place semi-finals

Seventh place game

Fifth place game

Medal round

Semi-finals

Bronze medal match

Gold medal match

Final standings

Notes

References
 Pan American Games field hockey medalists on HickokSports

1979 Pan American Games
1979
1979 Pan American Games
Pan American Games